Kurt Knoblauch (December 10, 1885 in Marienwerder – November 10, 1952 in Munich) was a German army officer and Waffen-SS general.

Biography
Knoblauch was a son of the tax collector Friedrich Knoblauch (? - September 25, 1922) and his wife Emma, ​​née Schröder. After graduating from high school in Ratzeburg, on February 23, 1905 Knoblauch joined the Prussian Army as a cadet in the 39th (Lower Rhenish) Fusilier Regiment. On August 18, 1906 he was promoted to lieutenant. On October 18, 1909 he was transferred to the 70th (8th Rhenish) Infantry Regiment and served as platoon commander. In May 1911 he was seconded to the 8th (1st Rhenish) Engineer Battalion for a month to gain engineering experience in the field. On October 1, 1912 Knoblauch became battalion adjutant and on February 17, 1914 he was promoted to first lieutenant. On May 1, 1914 he was transferred to the Saarbrücken district command. During World War I, starting on August 2, 1914, he became a company commander in the 32nd Brigade Replacement Battalion. On June 18, 1915 he was promoted to captain. Durning the war he was wounded several times.

In 1919, after the war, Knoblauch served in the Freikorps Deutsche Schutzdivision before being taken over by the Provisional Reichswehr. He first headed the 4th Machine Gun Company, then became chief of the 12th Company of the 3rd Rifle Regiment, and then served as intelligence officer in the 18th Infantry Regiment in Paderborn. On February 1, 1926 he was promoted to major and then to lieutenant colonel on April 1, 1930. As such he led the 2nd Battalion of the 1st (Prussian) Infantry Regiment. On April 1, 1931, Knoblauch became a member of the regimental staff. He retired from the army on March 31, 1933, having received his final promotion to Oberst in February. Knoblauch joined the Nazi Party on April 20, 1933 (membership number 2,750,158) and joined the Sturmabteilung. He served full-time as an SA leader until stepping down on April 12, 1935 to join the Schutzstaffel (SS No. 266,653).

From 1937 onwards he served in the Nazi Party Chancellery, aiding the war preparation.

In May 1940 he was appointed Inspector of the Replacement Units of the SS Totenkopf Division and became one of Heinrich Himmler's closest confidants. In December 1940 he became Commander of the Waffen-SS in the Netherlands.  On April 7, 1941, he was appointed as Chief of Staff of the Kommandostab Reichsführer-SS. In July 1942 he was transferred to the SS Führungshauptamt to head the training department (Amtsgruppe B). In that position he was also responsible for the coordination of SS support for Wehrmacht and police operations, including persecution of the Jews in instances like the Pripyat Marshes massacres. In 1943 he was replaced by Ernst Rode. In June 1944 he was promoted to SS-Obergruppenführer. In December 1949, during the denazification after the war, Knoblauch was classified as an activist (Offender, Category II) by the Munich Courts and sentenced to two years in a labor camp. In June 1950, a Munich arbitration court rejected Knoblauch's appeal, and confirmed the verdict of the first court.

See also 
Register of SS leaders in general's rank
The Holocaust in the Soviet Union

References

1885 births
1952 deaths
Holocaust perpetrators in Belarus
SS-Obergruppenführer
German Army personnel of World War I
German people of World War II
SS and Police Leaders
Reichswehr personnel
20th-century Freikorps personnel